Uladislau Herculano de Freitas Guimarães (November 25, 1865 in Arroio Grande – May 14, 1926 in Rio de Janeiro) was a Brazilian politician and an advocate.

He entered various public ways in the 1890s. In 1913 and in 1914, he was minister of Justice during the Hermes da Fonseca government and director of the Direct Faculty in São Paulo from 1916 until 1925.

In 1925, he was nominated ministry of the Supreme Federal Tribunal.

References

1866 births
1926 deaths
People from Rio Grande do Sul
University of São Paulo alumni
Ministers of Justice of Brazil